Vítor Emanuel Cruz da Silva (born 7 January 1984), known simply as Vítor, is a Portuguese professional footballer who plays as a central midfielder.

Club career
Born in Penafiel, Vítor joined local F.C. Penafiel's youth system in 1993 at the age of nine. He alternated between the second and third divisions in his first eight years as a senior, also representing A.D. Lousada, U.S.C. Paredes and C.F. União.

Vítor reached the Primeira Liga in the 2011–12 season, signing for F.C. Paços de Ferreira. He made his debut in the competition on 14 August, starting in a 2–1 away loss against Vitória de Setúbal.

Vítor contributed 29 games – 28 starts – and five goals in 2012–13, helping Paços to a best-ever third position with the subsequent qualification for the UEFA Champions League. Midway through the campaign, he was linked with a move to S.L. Benfica, with Jorge Mendes reportedly working to secure a transfer.

Also in 2013 but in the off-season, Vítor joined another Lisbon side, Sporting CP. On 26 August of the following year he signed with CF Reus Deportiu, moving to the Spaniards alongside teammate Rúben Semedo who signed on loan.

On 31 August 2018, after Reus' registration problems meant that Vítor could not play for the club during the first half of the campaign, he terminated his contract. On 5 March 2019, following a period of trial, he moved to Deportivo de La Coruña also of the Spanish Segunda División.

References

External links

1984 births
Living people
People from Penafiel
Portuguese footballers
Association football midfielders
Primeira Liga players
Liga Portugal 2 players
Segunda Divisão players
F.C. Penafiel players
A.D. Lousada players
U.S.C. Paredes players
C.F. União players
F.C. Paços de Ferreira players
Sporting CP footballers
Sporting CP B players
C.D. Feirense players
Lusitânia F.C. players
Segunda División players
Segunda División B players
CF Reus Deportiu players
Deportivo de La Coruña players
Portuguese expatriate footballers
Expatriate footballers in Spain
Portuguese expatriate sportspeople in Spain
Sportspeople from Porto District